Heterodrilus flexuosus is a species of oligochaete worm, first found in Belize, on the Caribbean side of Central America.

References

Further reading
Diaz, Robert J., and Christer Erseus. "Habitat preferences and species associations of shallow-water marine Tubificidae (Oligochaeta) from the barrier reef ecosystems off Belize, Central America." Aquatic Oligochaete Biology V. Springer Netherlands, 1994. 93-105.
Rousset, Vincent, et al. "Evolution of habitat preference in Clitellata (Annelida)." Biological Journal of the Linnean Society 95.3 (2008): 447-464.
Sjölin, Erica, and Lena M. Gustavsson. "An ultrastructural study of the cuticle in the marine annelid Heterodrilus (Tubificidae, Clitellata)." Journal of morphology 269.1 (2008): 45-53.

External links
WORMS

Naididae
Taxa named by Christer Erséus